The Dunlop Bridge is a landmark advertising footbridge. There are several of them, situated at a number of different motor racing circuits around the world. The oldest surviving example of this bridge is at the Circuit de la Sarthe, the home of the 24 Hours of Le Mans.

The bridge is regarded as one of the most recognisable features at a motorsport venue, particularly the Circuit de la Sarthe and Donington Park, although the latter was removed during renovations for the failed attempt to stage the 2010 British F1 Grand Prix, and due to new racing safety regulations, cannot be restored.

DJ Chris Evans bought the Donington Park bridge while visiting a racing memorabilia auction in September 2012.

List of race circuits featuring a Dunlop Bridge
Italics indicate that the bridge is no longer within the circuit.

A Dunlop Bridge also exists in the Apricot Hill Raceway, a fictional racetrack in the Gran Turismo series, although the branding was removed in Gran Turismo 6.

See also
Red Bull, who also have a distinctive footbridge at race events.

Notes

References

Buildings and structures in Sarthe
Buildings and structures in Le Mans
Footbridges
Pedestrian bridges in France
Pedestrian bridges in England
Goodyear Tire and Rubber Company
Tourist attractions in Sarthe
Bridges in Leicestershire